"Reach Out I'll Be There" (also formatted as "Reach Out (I'll Be There)") is a song recorded by the Four Tops from their fourth studio album Reach Out (1967). Written and produced by Motown's main production team, Holland–Dozier–Holland, the song is one of the most widely-known Motown hits of the 1960s and is today considered the Four Tops' signature song.

It was the number one song on the Rhythm & Blues chart for two weeks and on the Billboard Hot 100 for two weeks, in October 15–22, 1966. The track also reached number one in the UK Singles Chart, becoming Motown's second UK chart-topper after The Supremes' 1964 release "Baby Love". It reached number one on October 27, 1966, and stayed there for three weeks.

Rolling Stone later ranked “Reach Out” number 206 on its list of "The 500 Greatest Songs of All Time". Billboard ranked the record as the number four song for 1966. In 2022, the single was selected by the Library of Congress for preservation in the National Recording Registry.

Writing and recording
In 1966, Holland, Dozier and Holland were writing new songs for the Four Tops to record for an album. Lamont Dozier said that he wanted to write "a journey of emotions with sustained tension, like a bolero. To get this across, I alternated the keys, from a minor, Russian feel in the verse to a major, gospel feel in the chorus."  He developed the lyrics with Eddie Holland, aiming for them to sound "as though they were being thrown down vocally."  Dozier said that they were strongly influenced by Bob Dylan at the time, commenting: "We wanted Levi [Stubbs] to shout-sing the lyrics... as a shout-out to Dylan."

For the recording, the writers and producers intentionally put Levi Stubbs at the top of his vocal range, according to Abdul Fakir of the Four Tops, "to make sure he'd have that cry and hunger and wailing in his voice." Arranger Paul Riser overdubbed instruments including a piccolo and flute in the intro, and a drum pattern made by using timpani mallets on a tambourine head. After the recording was completed and on hearing the final version, the group begged Berry Gordy not to release it; according to Fakir, "for us, the song felt a little odd." However, Gordy insisted that it be issued as a single.

Style
Lead singer Levi Stubbs delivers many of the lines in the song in a tone that some suggest straddles the line between singing and shouting, as he did in the 1965 hit, "I Can't Help Myself (Sugar Pie Honey Bunch)". AllMusic critic Ed Hogan praises Stubbs' vocal as well as the song's "rock-solid groove" and "dramatic, semi-operatic tension and release." Critic Martin Charles Strong calls the song "a soul symphony of epic proportions that remains [the Four Tops'] signature tune."

In 2014, interviewed by The Guardian, Four Tops singer Duke Fakir said:

Reception
Cash Box said that it is "a hard-driving, pulsating pop-r&b romancer about a very-much-in-love guy who claims that he'll always be at his gal's beck-and-call."

Charts

Weekly charts

1Remix

2Michael Bolton with the Four Tops

Year-end charts

Certifications

Legacy
The version by the Four Tops was used by Joe Biden during his campaign in the 2020 United States presidential election.

Diana Ross version

Diana Ross covered "Reach Out, I'll Be There" in 1971. Her version was  released from her LP Surrender.  This version reached number 29 on the US Billboard Hot 100 and number 35 in Canada. Her rendition was produced by Ashford & Simpson.

Weekly charts

Gloria Gaynor version

"Reach Out, I'll Be There" was covered by Gloria Gaynor in 1975. It was the third of three singles released from her LP Never Can Say Goodbye.

Gaynor's version of "Reach Out, I'll Be There" became an international hit. It reached number 60 in the U.S. and number 16 in Canada. In Europe, it reached number 14 in the UK and number five in Germany.

Charts

Weekly charts

Year-end charts

See also
Reach Out: The Motown Record
List of Billboard Hot 100 number-one singles of 1966
List of Cash Box Top 100 number-one singles of 1966
List of number-one R&B singles of 1966 (U.S.)
List of UK Singles Chart number ones of the 1960s

References

1966 songs
1966 singles
1971 singles
1975 singles
Billboard Hot 100 number-one singles
Cashbox number-one singles
Four Tops songs
Diana Ross songs
Grammy Hall of Fame Award recipients
Gloria Gaynor songs
Michael Bolton songs
MGM Records singles
Motown singles
Song recordings produced by Brian Holland
Song recordings produced by Lamont Dozier
Song recordings produced by Ashford & Simpson
Songs written by Holland–Dozier–Holland
UK Singles Chart number-one singles
United States National Recording Registry recordings